Ahmad Muhammad Shakir  (January 29, 1892, Cairo –  June 14, 1958) was an Egyptian Islamic scholar of hadith. He is the son of Muḥammad Shākir ibn Aḥmad, an Islamic scholar of Al-Azhar University and elder brother of Mahmud Muhammad Shakir, a writer and journalist.

As editor, Shākir's Cairo publication, from 1937 in 5 volumes, provided the standard topical classification of the hadith Arabic text for Sunan at-Tirmidhi. The work was subject to many reprints.

Positions held
He graduated from and worked at Al-Azhar University and retired in 1951. Among the positions that he held was that of vice-chairman of the Supreme Shariah Court in Cairo.

Works
 al-Ba'ith al-Hathith: his explanation of Ibn Kathir's Ikhtisaar 'Uloom al-Hadith, an abridgement of the Muqaddimah in hadith terminology
 Musnad Ahmad ibn Hanbal: his footnotes to approximately the first third of Ahmad ibn Hanbal's large collection of hadith
 Jaami' al-Bayyaan, commonly referred to as Tafsir al-Tabari: footnotes to Muhammad ibn Jarir al-Tabari's explanation of the Quran; incomplete
 Sunan al-Tirmidhi: his footnotes to about the first third of this hadith collection
 al-Muhalla: footnotes to the fiqh book of ibn Hazm
 al-'Aqidah al-Tahaawiyyah: editing and footnotes to the famous book of Sunni creed by Ahmad ibn Muhammad al-Tahawi
 'Umdah al-Tafsir: abridgement of Tafsir ibn Kathir; incomplete

References

External links

Ahmed Shaker's Profile in islamonline.net 

Hadith scholars
1892 births
1958 deaths
Egyptian Sunni Muslims
Sharia judges
Al-Azhar University alumni
Academic staff of Al-Azhar University
Biographical evaluation scholars
Islamic scholars in Egypt